Miriam Jordan (3 March 1904 – 4 December 1987) was a British stage and film actress. She enjoyed a brief career in Hollywood as a leading lady during the early 1930s, but most of her work was confined to the stage.

Selected filmography

References

Bibliography 
 Aubrey Solomon. The Fox Film Corporation, 1915-1935: A History and Filmography. McFarland, 2011.

External links 
 

1904 births
1987 deaths
British film actresses
Actresses from London
20th-century British actresses
20th-century English women
20th-century English people